Doom: The Politics of Catastrophe is a 2021 book by Niall Ferguson that offers a global history of disaster and examines how leaders respond to catastrophes.

Reviews
The book has three "positive" reviews, one "rave" review, six "mixed" reviews, and three "pan" reviews according to review aggregator Book Marks.  Damon Linker of the New York Times argues that the book is "often insightful, productively provocative and downright brilliant" and suggests that Ferguson displays "an impressive command of the latest research in a large number of specialized fields, among them medical history, epidemiology, probability theory, cliodynamics and network theory". However Linker also criticises the book's "perplexing lacunae".  In a review for The Times, David Aaronovitch described Ferguson's theory as "nebulous".

References

2021 non-fiction books
English-language books
Penguin Press books